"Tableau Vivant" is the 23rd episode of the third season of the American sitcom Modern Family, and the series' 71st episode overall. It aired on May 16, 2012. The episode was written by Elaine Ko, Jeffrey Richman and Bill Wrubel, and directed by Gail Mancuso.

Plot
At the Dunphys' house, no one seems to be able to sleep, each for their own reasons. Luke (Nolan Gould) cannot wait for the hero medal he is going to receive the next day at school because he extinguished a fire — though he started it, but only he and Manny (Rico Rodriguez) know this. Alex (Ariel Winter) is nervous about her school art project because she wants to impress the art teacher who after a year does not even know her name, which is unusual for Alex, who is always a standout pupil in other classes. Meanwhile, Phil (Ty Burrell) searches for a way to tell his brother-in-law, Mitch (Jesse Tyler Ferguson), that he is fired from his part-time job at Phil's real estate agency.

The next morning, Phil visits Mitch's house to tell him about his dismissal while Mitch also tries to tell him that he does not want to continue working at the agency. Mitch does not admit it to Phil, and Phil mistakenly believes that Mitch understood that Phil gently fired him. However, when Mitch appears at the agency later, Phil is forced to finally explicitly tell Mitch. When Mitch tries to leave the office, the elevator breaks down with the doors partially open, though not enough for him to fit through. He is stuck in the elevator for two hours while knowing he has been fired. The idea of losing his job does not sit well with him since, as he later explains to Cam (Eric Stonestreet), he has never been fired.

Jay (Ed O'Neill) takes Gloria (Sofía Vergara) to a diner to show her that they named a sandwich there after him. When Gloria tastes it, she says that she does not like it and that she is also jealous of their waitress, Maxine (Beth Grant), because Maxine seems to know more about Jay's life than she does.

Meanwhile, Cam demonstrates a theory about how a parent should discipline their kids: that they should never say "no" but redirect the kids to another activity. Claire (Julie Bowen) disagrees with it, insisting that it will end in disaster. Cam disagrees until Lily nearly turns on the kitchen sink garbage disposal while Cam's hand is inside it.

After all these conflicts during the day, the whole family convenes to participate in Alex's living art display of Norman Rockwell's Thanksgiving painting Freedom from Want. During the live display, everyone is talking about their recent frustrations with each other while trying to be still at the same time. That leads Alex to get a B− on the project, but she is satisfied since at least the art teacher, who previously called her "Alice", finally learned her name.

The episode ends at the diner where all the family gathers to try the sandwich that was named after Jay, whereas Jay thought that no one would appear after everything that happened during the day.

Reception

Ratings
In its original American broadcast, "Tableau Vivant" was watched by 9.36 million, down 1.22 million from the previous episode.

Reviews
Reviews for this episode were generally positive.

Donna Bowman of The A.V. Club gave an A− grade. She said "I’ve said it before and I’ll say it again. What Modern Family can do so well is create an escalating snowball of farce that, when everyone ends up in the same place, unleashes a storm of comic possibilities. This episode may not be the pinnacle of that style, but it unfolds with a sense of ease, confidence, economy, and generosity that any sitcom would be proud to match. I mean, look at that beautifully underplayed closing tableau. That’s what it’s for, after all. Just look at it".

Leigh Raines of TV Fanatic gave a 4.5/5 grade. About his favorite part of the show he said: "Hands down my favorite part of this episode was small, but perfect. When Haley walked in after a night out and thought Phil was reprimanding her but really he was practicing his speech to Mitchell, I thought she was so busted."

Wyner C of Two Cents TV also gave a good review to the episode. "I laughed so much during this episode. I’ve always said, the show is best when the family is together."

Michael Adams of 411mania rated the episode with 7/10 giving a most mixed review. "All in all, it was a good episode, but as it was one of the final episodes of the season and they have some story lines to wrap up, they should have put this episode somewhere in the middle of the season."

References

External links 
 
 "Tableau Vivant" at ABC.com

2012 American television episodes
Modern Family (season 3) episodes